Events from the year 1905 in Sweden

Incumbents
 Monarch – Oscar II
 Prime Minister – 
 until April 13: Erik Gustaf Boström 
 April 13-August 2: Johan Ramstedt 
 August 2-November 7: Christian Lundeberg 
 starting November 7: Karl Staaff

Events

 February 4–12 – The Nordic Games take place in Stockholm.
  April 14 – Erik Gustaf Boström resigns as the Prime Minister of Sweden, over the issue of the Swedish- Norwegian Union. His Minister without Portfolio, Johan Ramstedt, becomes the new Prime Minister of Sweden.
 June 7 – The Norwegian Parliament declares the union with Sweden dissolved, and Norway achieves full independence.
 June 15 – Princess Margaret of Connaught marries Prince Gustaf Adolf of Sweden, Duke of Skåne (Gustaf VI Adolf of Sweden).
 August 2  – The businessman and right-wing politician Christian Lundeberg becomes Prime Minister of Sweden.
 October 26 – Sweden agrees to the repeal of the union with Norway.
 November 7 – The lawyer and liberal politician Karl Staaff becomes Prime Minister of Sweden, after an Riksdag election based mainly about, voting rights reform.
 November 8 – Foundation of the Women's Cooperative Swedish Home by Anna Whitlock in Stockholm.

Births
  – Sven Rydell, football player (died 1975) 
  – Arne Beurling, mathematician 
  – Ulf von Euler, physiologist 
  – Torsten Nilsson, social democrat

Deaths
 16 April – Thérèse Elfforss, actress (born 1823) 
  – Emily Nonnen, writer (born 1812) 
 December  – Martin Wiberg, inventor (born 1826) 
  – Hjalmar Stolpe, entomologist, archaeologist, and ethnographer (born 1841)

References

 
Sweden
Years of the 20th century in Sweden